This is a list of past and present satellites of the BeiDou/Compass navigation satellite system. , 44 satellites are operational: 7 in geostationary orbits (GEO), 10 in 55° inclined geosynchronous orbits (IGSO) and 27 in Medium Earth orbits (MEO). Furthermore, 5 satellites (2 in Medium Earth orbit, 1 in geostationary orbit and 2 in inclined geosynchronous orbit) are undergoing testing or commissioning. The full constellation consists of 35 satellites and was completed on 23 June 2020.

Satellites

Summary table

Full list

Medium Earth Orbit Satellites Orbital slots

See also 

 List of Galileo satellites
 List of GLONASS satellites
 List of GPS satellites
 List of NAVIC satellites

References

External links 
 BeiDou Constellation Status (Test and Assessment Research Center of China Satellite Navigation Office)

 
BeiDou